Senator Welsh may refer to:

Isaac Welsh (1811–1875), Ohio State Senate
Matthew E. Welsh (1912–1995), Indiana State Senate